Ferdinand Louis Rudolph (born 1899, date of death unknown) was a Belgian ice hockey player. He competed in the men's tournament at the 1924 Winter Olympics.

References

External links
 

1899 births
Year of death missing
Ice hockey players at the 1924 Winter Olympics
Olympic ice hockey players of Belgium
Place of birth missing